Up The Country is a popular poem by iconic Australian writer and poet Henry Lawson. It was first published in The Bulletin magazine on 9 July 1892, under the title Borderland, and started the Bulletin Debate, a series of poems by both Lawson and Andrew Barton "Banjo" Paterson about the true nature of life in the Australian bush.

In Up The Country, Lawson recounts his trip to the barren and gloomy Australian bush, and criticises "City Bushmen" such as Banjo Paterson who tended to romanticize bush life.

Paterson later responded with a poem of his own, entitled In Defense of the Bush, in which he accused Lawson of representing bush life as nothing but doom and gloom, famously ending with the line "For the bush will never suit you, and you'll never suit the bush."

Publication details 
First published The Weekly Bulletin, 9 July 1892
Source: In The Days When The World Was Wide, And Other Stories,' 1892

See also
 1892 in poetry
 1892 in Australian literature
 1892 in literature
 The Bulletin Debate
 Australian literature

References 

1892 poems
Poetry by Henry Lawson
Bulletin Debate
Works originally published in The Bulletin (Australian periodical)